María José Soto Gil (born June 14, 1978) is a Venezuelan softball player. Soto competed as a member and captain of the national softball team at the 2008 Summer Olympics where she was Venezuela's flag bearer in the opening ceremony.

From 2022 she is president of the Comité Olímpico Venezolano

References

External links
NBC 2008 Olympics profile

1978 births
Living people
People from Carabobo
Venezuelan softball players
Olympic softball players of Venezuela
Softball players at the 2008 Summer Olympics
Competitors at the 2013 World Games
World Games silver medalists
World Games medalists in softball